St Mary's Church, Higham Ferrers is a Church of England parish church in Higham Ferrers, Northamptonshire. It is a Grade I listed building.

History and description

The present church was founded by a charter of King Henry III in about 1220, with the tower being the last part of the first phase to be completed in about 1250. A large proportion of the original church survives to the present.

The next phase of building, in about 1320, was the widening of the north aisle and the replacement of the nave arcade, to allow for the insertion of the Lady Chapel.  Additional windows were added to the chancel and the south aisle.

The clerestory and the low pitched roof, with parapets is from the early 15th century, possibly under the auspices of Bishop Henry Chichele, later Archbishop of Canterbury. Chichele also had the rood screen and choir stalls with their misericords installed in about 1425. It is worth noting that Archbishop Chichele also had All Souls College, Oxford built, and there is a definite family resemblance between both sets of misericords, it is possible that the same carver, possibly Richard Tyllock, created both.

In 1631, the spire and part of the tower collapsed, and was then repaired shortly afterwards. This was the last work performed on the fabric of the church. Simon Jenkins, in his England's Thousand Best Churches, describes the spire as "one of the finest in a county famous for spires" Two restorations took place during the 19th century, but both seem to have been sympathetically performed.

The tower contains a ring of ten bells, the previous eight having been restored and rehung in a new frame, together with two new bells, in 2014 by John Taylor & Co, Loughborough, the project marking the 600th anniversary of Henry Chichele's consecration as Archbishop of Canterbury. 167 full peals were rung on the eight bells and thirty three have now been rung on the ten, one being in a new "method", Regnum Diutissime ("the longest reign") Delight Royal in honour of the Queen having become the longest-reigning British monarch.

One of the chief glories of the church is the west porch. Built between 1270 and 1280, it is almost certainly the work of one of the foreign masons employed in the rebuilding of Westminster Abbey, the style and quality of the work here closely resembling the porch of the North transept of the Abbey. Simon Jenkins, awarding St Mary's three stars, says:
The west front of the tower is little short of sensational, a gallery of medieval decoration attributed to French masons from Westminster. The twin doors are framed with carvings and a Tree of Jesse rising from a central shaft. The unusual roundels in the tympanum, based on illuminated manuscripts, are of New Testament scenes. Sculpture dots each front, including on the north a charming man making music while locked in the stocks. Some of the niches have excellent modern statues in them.

Memorials
One of the earliest examples in England, the elaborate memorial brass to Laurence St. Maur, (died 1337) is considered by Pevsner to be one of the finest brass monuments in England. Originally on the chancel floor, it was placed on an altar tomb, between the two chancels, in 1633.  St. Maur wears a heavily embroidered liturgical vestment and around his neck is a rectangle of cloth embroidered with cinquefoils.

Above the main figure in the canopy is a group of figures. Abraham is seated in the middle and holds a globe in his left hand, with his right hand raised in benediction. St. Andrew and St. Peter are to the left of him and the St. Paul and St. Thomas are to the right. Angels, on either side of Abraham, hold St. Maur's soul. In his 1912 book Brasses, John Sebastian Marlowe Ward says: "Canopies over Mass priests are very rare and this is by far the finest."

Bede House and Chantry Chapel
Adjacent to the church, at the west, is the Chantry Chapel, also a Grade I listed building. Built in the early 15th century for Archbishop Chichele, it was restored in the 20th century by Temple Moore. It is of limestone ashlar with lead roof. It was used as a Grammar School from 1542 to 1906 and was re-dedicated as a chantry chapel in 1942.

To the south of the church, across the churchyard, is the bede house, also a Grade I listed building. Built in about 1428 it was restored in the 19th century. It is of squared coursed and banded limestone and ironstone, with a plain tile 20th-century roof. It is now used as the church hall.

The chantry chapel and Bede House, both Perpendicular Gothic in style, are open to the public.

The stone cross in the churchyard, another Grade I listed building, was known in 1463 as the Wardeyn or Warden Cross. It was restored in 1919 as a war memorial.

Rectors and vicars

 1238–1239: Master Hubert de Cotmanmeston
 1268–1275: Roger de St Philibert
 1275–1289: Master Robert de Hanneya
 1289–1335: Lawrence de Sancto Mauro
 1335–1337: Prebendary of Hinton
 1337–1346: Master Henry de la Dale
 1346: John Paynell
 Richard de Melburn
 1350–1357: John de Stafford
 1357–1358: William Mildrithe of Knyghton
 1361–1363: Robert Hardegray
 1363–1366: Henry Wakeries
 1369–1374: John Godinche
 1374–1387: Henry Knot
 1387–1388: John Benethon de Wolaston
 1404–1414: John Halleswayne
 1414–1415: Henry de Bilburgh
 1415–1416: John Bradbourne
 1422–1429: William Moyes
 1429–1430: Elias Holcote
 1437–1438: William More
 1438–1444: Warden of Merton
 1444–1461: Richard Whyte
 1461–1465: Thomas Rudde
 1465–1469: William Blankeney
 1469–1482: John Ward
 1482–1487: William Bryan
 1487–1488: John Frende
 1492–1504: Richard Chauncellor
 1504–1523: Richard Wylleys
 1523–1534: William Fawntleroy
 1534–1542: Robert Goldson
 1542–1597: (no rector: church served by a series of curates)
 1597–1599: Clement Gregory
 1605–1631: Nichols Leonard
 1631–1635: John Hill
 1635–1645: John Digby
 1647–1658: Henry Pheasant
 1662-1662: ? Harrison
 1662–1676: John Knighton
 1676–1691: Samuel Lee
 1691–1726: Richard Willis
 1726–1730: John Glassbrook
 1730–1735: William Doyly
 1735–1740: George Tymms
 1740–1745: Thomas Bright
 1745–1752: William Withers
 1752–1761: Francis Greenwood
 1762–1802: George Pasley Malim
 1803–1830: George Warcup Malim
 1830–1837: Thomas Wentworth Gage
 1837–1868: George Malim
 1868–1885: Edward Templeman
 1885–1889: George Hamslip Hopkins
 1889–1906: James Dunn
 1906–1911: Gerard Marby Davidson
 1911–1923: Herbert Kearsley Fry
 1923–1933: Basil Eversley Owen
 1933–1945: Philip Kirk
 1945–1952: Harold Stanley Hoar
 1952–1964: Cecil Stafford Ford
 1965–1988: Roger William Davison
 1988–1997: Eric Buchanan
 1998–2013: Grant Lindley Brockhouse
 2014–2019: Richard Stainer

Gallery

References

Church of England church buildings in Northamptonshire
Rushden
13th-century church buildings in England
Grade I listed churches in Northamptonshire
Anglo-Catholic church buildings in Northamptonshire